Siriraj, a neighbourhood in Bangkok, Thailand may refer to:

 Siriraj Hospital
 Faculty of Medicine Siriraj Hospital, Mahidol University
 Siri Rat Subdistrict of Bangkok Noi District, the neighbourhood with Wang Lang market and Siriraj Hospital
 Wang Lang (Siri Rat) Pier of the Chao Phraya Express Boat Service